"Can't Fight This Feeling" is a power ballad performed by the American rock band REO Speedwagon. The song first appeared on the 1984 album Wheels Are Turnin'. The single reached number one on the Billboard Hot 100 chart and held the top spot for three consecutive weeks from March 9 to March 23, 1985. It was the group's second number-one hit on the U.S. charts (the first being 1980's "Keep on Loving You", also written by Kevin Cronin) and reached number sixteen in the UK. "Can't Fight This Feeling" has appeared on dozens of 'various artists' compilation albums, as well as several REO Speedwagon greatest hits albums.

REO Speedwagon performed the song at the 1985 Live Aid concert; they were introduced by Chevy Chase.

Background
Cronin said that he wrote the verses years before, and had made a demo of it when he left REO Speedwagon briefly in the mid-70s.  Cronin finished writing the song in Hawaii while supposedly on a break from composing for the Wheels Are Turnin album.  According to REO Speedwagon drummer Alan Gratzer, the song is about a relationship Cronin had and it took Cronin several years to come up with all the lyrics.

According to Cronin, the inspiration for the song was the hurt he felt when he became attracted to a woman who was part of his friend group. Cronin states that this woman was “…of course, going out with my friend, so I kept it to myself. There was a group of us who would hang out together...and she was always there.  Eventually she and I were becoming friends, but there was no hanky-panky going on.  The more I got to know her, the more I liked her, but I couldn't say anything about it.”

Cronin said that he was only able to finish the song when he "couldn't fight the feeling anymore and made the move to kind of go for it."  He said he "knew those verses were something special because of the depth (of feeling). I felt for them. I couldn't force it."  Cronin said that when he did express his feelings to the woman, they ended up having a great relationship, and although it didn't last they remained friends.

Cronin described the theme of the song as being about "that moment in time where...it gets too painful to be where you are and you know you have to change...but change is hard...and you overcome that fear of change."

The other REO Speedwagon members referred to "Can't Fight This Feeling" as "that stupid ballad" until it became a charting hit.

Composition
Can’t Fight This Feeling is in the key of A  major.

Reception
Chicago Tribune critic Jan DeKnock said that the song "rode a pretty melody all the way to No. 1."  DeKnock also said that it was "the latest in a series of ballads that have found success on the dance-dominated charts with a tried and true formula: A melody that is pretty enough for adult contemporary listeners, with instrumentation that is strong enough for rock-oriented radio stations.  Billboard recommended the single, calling it a "midtempo rock ballad."  Rapid City Journal writer Mike Sanborn called it one of REO Speedwagon's "best ballads."  Palm Beach Post music writer Leslie Gray Streeter named it her 3rd greatest power ballad.  Arizona Republic writer Andrew Means noted that the song "has a similar tone of emotional frailty [as some ballads on Hi Infidelity], which revives comparisons with such so-called 'corporate rock' entities as Foreigner and Journey."   Streeter attributes the song's success to its combination of "frighteningly candid emotion with searing rock guitar. But Greg Kennedy of the Red Deer Advocate called it a "bland formula-fed composition."

Austin American-Statesman writer Drew Carr felt that the performance of REO Speedwagon keyboardist Neal Doughty was particularly effective on this song.

Music video
Two different music videos exist for the song. Both videos have been shown at various times on VH1 Classic (now known as MTV Classic).

Version 1: Studio (videotape)
The videotaped version was produced by MTV for a special on REO Speedwagon and features the band in the studio. It begins with Kevin Cronin playing the piano, attempting to find the key in which he can best sing the song (starting off in G major, he later decides he can sing it better in A). After Cronin exchanges some laughs with his bandmates, the original track of the song plays, with the band members miming their respective parts. It concludes with Cronin uttering the line, "That warmed the cockles of my cockles!"

Version 2: Film
The second more famous version, directed by John Jopson, was considered a "more professional one" and makes various references to the life-cycle and shows the band singing the song.

Personnel
REO Speedwagon
Kevin Cronin - lead and backing vocals, acoustic guitar
Gary Richrath - electric guitar
Neal Doughty - piano
Alan Gratzer - drums
Bruce Hall - bass guitar

Other personnel
Bill Cuomo - orchestration

Chart performance

Weekly charts

Year-end charts

All-time charts

Certifications

Bastille version

In 2019, English indie pop band Bastille released a cover version of the song, featuring the London Contemporary Orchestra. It was released on November 19, 2019 by Virgin EMI Records. The song was selected as the soundtrack to the 2019 John Lewis Christmas advert.

Charts

References

1984 songs
1984 singles
1985 singles
REO Speedwagon songs
Epic Records singles
Virgin EMI Records singles
Billboard Hot 100 number-one singles
Cashbox number-one singles
RPM Top Singles number-one singles
Songs written by Kevin Cronin
Song recordings produced by Gary Richrath
Song recordings produced by Kevin Cronin
American soft rock songs
1980s ballads
Rock ballads